The Saut Hermès is an annual show jumping competition held at the Grand Palais in Paris, France. It is sponsored by the fashion company Hermès. It was won by Abdelkebir Ouaddar in 2016.

References

External links
Official website

Show jumping events
Equestrian sports competitions in France
2009 establishments in France
Hermès-Dumas family